This is a list of Finnish comedians.

Viktor Kalborrek
Ismo Leikola
Vesa-Matti Loiri
Spede Pasanen
Pirkka-Pekka Petelius
Krisse Salminen
Simo Salminen
Pentti Siimes
André Wickström
Sami Hedberg
Iikka Kivi

See also

List of comedians
List of Finnish people

 
Finnish comedians
Comedians